is a Japanese racewalker. He competed in the 20 km walk at the 2012 Summer Olympics, where he placed 18th.  He was also part of Japan's 20 km team at the 2016 Summer Olympics.  He competed at the 2009 and 2015 World Championships.

References

1987 births
Living people
Japanese male racewalkers
Olympic male racewalkers
Olympic athletes of Japan
Athletes (track and field) at the 2012 Summer Olympics
Athletes (track and field) at the 2016 Summer Olympics
Asian Games competitors for Japan
Athletes (track and field) at the 2010 Asian Games
World Athletics Championships athletes for Japan
Japan Championships in Athletics winners
20th-century Japanese people
21st-century Japanese people